"Medicate" is a song written and recorded by Internet personality and singer-songwriter Gabbie Hanna released on February 1, 2019. It was released for digital download and streaming as the lead single from Hanna's debut EP, 2WayMirror. It was written by Hanna alongside American music production duo Lyre (Alina Smith & Elli Moore), who also produced the track.

Music and lyrics
"Medicate" has a length of three minutes and twenty four seconds. It is in the key of G minor, with Hanna's vocal range spanning from the low note of F3 to the high note of C5. The lyrics of "Medicate" explore the theme of anti-depressants and wondering if it will help with depression.

Critical reception
Nashmia Adnan, writing for Dankanator, called the song "more professional and mature" in comparison to her previous singles.

Music video 
A music video for the song was uploaded to Youtube on February 2, 2019. The video features Hanna in a warehouse, sitting on a chair with multiple of the same chairs forming a circle. At the climax to the song, a second version of Hanna appears—a version seen in previous music videos of hers.

Live performances 
Hanna performed "Medicate" on February 17, 2019 at VidCon London. She would later perform the song again at VidCon LA on July 13, 2019 alongside the rest of 2WayMirror.

Hanna performed "Medicate" at the First Inaugural Patreon Assembly on November 2, 2019 along with "Monster", "Monster (Reborn)", and two unreleased songs: "Sleepyhead" and "Today".

Commercial performance
Commercially, "Medicate" experienced modest chart success overall. In North America, the single became Hanna's third US Digital Songs entry, debuting and peaking at number 31. In the United Kingdom, it peaked at number 97 on the country's Downloads chart, making it her lowest entry on said chart. In Scotland, the single debuted and peaked at number 80 in Scotland, making it her fifth entry on the chart. It became Hanna's most successful single in Oceania, debuting and peaking at number 32 on the New Zealand Hot Singles chart. In the process, it became Hanna's first single to enter a main chart in Oceania.

Charts

Release history

References 

2019 songs
Gabbie Hanna songs
Songs about depression
Songs about drugs